Şirinyer is a proposed underground station on the Üçyol—Çamlıkule Line of the İzmir Metro. It will be located beneath Mehmet Akif Avenue, next to the Şirinyer railway station, in western Buca. Construction of the station, along with the metro line, is expected to begin in 2020. Connection to İZBAN commuter rail service will be available from the station. Once complete, Şirinyer will become the fourth station on the İzmir Metro to have direct connection to heavy rail service, along with Basmane, Hilal and Halkapınar. İzmir Metro (or İzmir Suburb), which travels between Aliağa and Selçuk Stations (All Station Points), gives out an advantage that passengers can take to pass Alsancak or Karşıyaka with single ticket without changes.

Şirinyer station is expected to open in 2024.

References

İzmir Metro
Railway stations scheduled to open in 2024
Rapid transit stations under construction in Turkey